Arkansas Highway 134 (AR 134, Hwy. 134) is an east–west state highway in Miller County, Arkansas. The route of  runs from US Route 71 (US 71) near Fouke to US 82 in Garland.

Route description
AR 134 begins near Fouke and runs east underneath Highway 549, but does not have a junction with the route. The route runs north near the Red River and runs to Highway 196. Highway 134 turns east and runs to Garland, when it terminates at US 82.

Former Choctaw route

This route first appeared on the October 1928 state highway map from Highway 9 to Choctaw; the current Highway 134 also first appeared at this time. This road remained on the map through July 1931, but was removed on the following map.

Major intersections

See also

 List of state highways in Arkansas

References

External links

134
Transportation in Miller County, Arkansas